Battle bus may refer to:
 The British English term for campaign bus
Armoured bus, a vehicle sometimes used for military applications
Police bus, a vehicle sometimes used in riot control
Armoured personnel carrier, sometimes called a "battle bus"
 The Battle Bus, a vehicle in the video game Fortnite Battle Royale